Frank Cignetti Sr. (October 8, 1937 – September 10, 2022) was an American football player and coach. He served as the head football coach at West Virginia University from 1976 to 1979 and at Indiana University of Pennsylvania (IUP) from 1986 to 2005, compiling a career college football record of 199–77–1. Cignetti led the IUP Indians to the title game of the NCAA Division II Football Championship in 1990 and 1993.  He was inducted into the College Football Hall of Fame as a coach in 2013.

Early life and education
Cignetti was born on October 8, 1937. He attended the Indiana University of Pennsylvania (IUP) and played college football and college basketball for the IUP Indians. As an end on the football team, Cignetti was a National Association of Intercollegiate Athletics All-American.

Cignetti graduated with a bachelor's degree in 1960. He earned a master's degree from IUP in 1965.

Coaching career
Cignetti's first coaching position was as an assistant for Leechburg High School's football team. He became Leechburg's head coach and coached them to the Western Pennsylvania Interscholastic Athletic League Class 1A championship in 1965. From 1966 to 1968, he was an assistant with the Pittsburgh Panthers, where he coached their quarterbacks and wide receivers. He served as an offensive assistant for the Princeton Tigers in 1969 and joined Bobby Bowden's coaching staff for the West Virginia Mountaineers, coaching the offensive backfield.

Cignetti succeeded Bowden as the Mountaineers' head coach in 1976 and coached them through the 1979 season. Though the team had won the 1975 Peach Bowl, 32 of its players were seniors, and Cignetti had to rebuild the program. He had a  record as West Virginia's head coach. In 1979, Cignetti was diagnosed with lymphomatoid granulomatosis, a form of cancer. He had a splenectomy and spent 35 days in the hospital. Cignetti was fired after the 1979 season, but recovered from cancer.

In 1982, Cignetti returned to IUP as the director of athletics. He became the head coach of IUP's football team in 1986. He coached IUP to a  record from 1986 to 2005. Under Cignetti, IUP won the Pennsylvania State Athletic Conference West Division 14 times and did not have a losing season. IUP appeared in NCAA Division II's semifinals five times and in the championship game twice. In 1991, he was the Division II coach of the year. His team won 10 Lambert Cups, as the best Division II team in the eastern United States.

Cignetti was inducted into the College Football Hall of Fame in 2013. Also in that year, IUP renamed its football field in honor of Cignetti.

Personal life
Cignetti and his wife, Marlene, had four children. Frank Jr. played football for his father at IUP from 1985 to 1987. Cignetti Jr. is a former offensive coordinator for the St. Louis Rams. His son Curt was announced as the head coach for IUP on January 21, 2011, after serving four years as wide receivers coach and recruiting coordinator at Alabama. Curt served as the head coach at Elon University from 2016 to 2018, and in December 2018 was named the eighth head coach of James Madison University.

Cignetti died on September 10, 2022.

Head coaching record
Sources

Explanatory notes

References

External links
 

1937 births
2022 deaths
American football ends
College Football Hall of Fame inductees
High school football coaches in Pennsylvania
IUP Crimson Hawks football coaches
IUP Crimson Hawks football players
People from Armstrong County, Pennsylvania
Pittsburgh Panthers football coaches
Players of American football from Pennsylvania
Princeton Tigers football coaches
West Virginia Mountaineers football coaches